Dénes Lukács (born 25 February 1987 in Eger) is a retired tennis player from Hungary.

Lukács has a career high ATP singles ranking of 402 achieved on 7 May 2012. He also has a career high ATP doubles ranking of 975, achieved on 19 March 2012. Lukács has won 2 ITF singles and 1 doubles titles.

Lukács has represented Hungary at Davis Cup, where he has a win–loss record of 2–3.

He played tennis at Baylor University between 2006-2010.

Future and Challenger finals

Singles: 4 (2–2)

Doubles 3 (1–2)

Davis Cup

Participations: (2–3)

   indicates the outcome of the Davis Cup match followed by the score, date, place of event, the zonal classification and its phase, and the court surface.

* Monaco chose to play in Hungary

References

Sources 
 
 
 

1987 births
Living people
Baylor Bears men's tennis players
Hungarian male tennis players
Sportspeople from Eger
20th-century Hungarian people
21st-century Hungarian people